In the Middle Ages or 16th and 17th centuries, a cloth merchant was one who owned or ran a cloth (often wool) manufacturing or wholesale import or export business. A cloth merchant might additionally own a number of draper's shops. Cloth was extremely expensive and cloth merchants were often very wealthy. A number of Europe's leading banking dynasties such as Medici and Berenberg built their original fortunes as cloth merchants.

In England, cloth merchants might be members of one of the important trade guilds, such as the Worshipful Company of Drapers.

Alternative names are clothier, which tended to refer more to someone engaged in production and the sale of cloth, whereas a cloth merchant would be more concerned with distribution, including overseas trade, or haberdasher, who were merchants in sewn and fine fabrics (e.g. silk) and in London, members of the Haberdashers' Company.

The largely obsolete term merchant taylor also describes a business person who trades in textiles, and initially a tailor who keeps and sells materials for the garments which he makes. In England, the term is best known in the context of the Worshipful Company of Merchant Taylors, one of the livery companies of the City of London, nowadays a charitable institution best known for the Merchant Taylors' schools – the Company preserves the ancient spelling "taylor" in its name.

Notable cloth merchants
 Alderman Robert Aske
 Sir William Gardiner
 John Kendrick
 Henry Machyn, diarist
 Jack O'Newbury
 William Paterson
 Thomas Spring of Lavenham
 Sir Thomas White

See also
 Clothing industry
 Textile industry

References

 01
Clothing industry
Sales occupations
Textile industry